John Gordon PC (23 November 1849 in County Down – 26 September 1922 in Dublin City) was an Irish lawyer and politician, who served as Attorney-General for Ireland and a Judge of the High Court.

Life and career
Gordon was the son of Samuel Gordon, of Shankhill, County Down, and Arabella Barclay. He was educated at Queen's College Galway, a constituent college of the Queen's University of Ireland, where he held a senior scholarship in mathematics, graduating with a B.A. degree in that subject (3rd class honours) in 1873, and LL.B. in 1876. He served as auditor of the college's Literary and Debating Society for the 1873-1874 session. He was awarded an L.L.D. (honoris causa) on the dissolution of the Queen's University in 1882. He was called to the Irish Bar at the King's Inns in 1877.

He married Dorothy Clay, daughter of Robert Keating  Clay, solicitor, in 1887; she predeceased him. They had one son, Alan, a barrister.

Gordon was elected a Member of Parliament for the South Londonderry constituency in 1900, as a representative of the Liberal Unionist and, after 1912, Irish Unionist interest, and served in the House of Commons until 1916. He was a committed Unionist, but had many nationalist friends, including Éamon de Valera.

On 1 October 1902, Gordon sent a letter to be read at the annual meeting of the Moray and Nairn Conservative Association. In this letter, he cited growing tensions in Europe and abroad in order to call for increased unity within the United Kingdom, stating that "We shall need amid the gathering difficulties of the future a united national voice in support of our empire's interests in peace or in where when these are threatened by a world-wide rivalry"

In June 1915 when his party joined the Asquith coalition government, he was appointed Attorney-General for Ireland, an office he held until April 1916, when he was appointed a judge of the King's Bench division of the High Court of Justice in Ireland. He also became a member of the Irish Privy Council in 1915.

He died in Dublin on 26 September 1922 aged 72, having been taken ill in a tram on his journey home from the Four Courts. 

Maurice Healy, who vividly described many of the Irish judges of his youth in his memoir "The Old Munster Circuit" confessed that Gordon had made almost no impression on him, except that he refused to wear bright colours. A more favourable view is that during his relatively brief career on the Bench he was an impartial and conscientious judge. Despite his committed Unionist beliefs he chose after 1921 to remain a judge in the Irish Free State.

References

Who Was Who, 1916-1922
Obituary, The Times (London), 27 September 1922

Francis Elrington Ball  The Judges in Ireland 1221-1921 John Murray London 1926
Maurice Healy  The Old Munster Circuit  Michael Joseph Ltd. 1939
Marshall, Robert D. "Gordon, John" Cambridge Dictionary of Irish Biography

External links
 

1849 births
1922 deaths
Alumni of the University of Galway
Attorneys-General for Ireland
Irish barristers
Members of the Privy Council of Ireland
Members of the Parliament of the United Kingdom for County Londonderry constituencies (1801–1922)
UK MPs 1900–1906
UK MPs 1906–1910
UK MPs 1910
UK MPs 1910–1918
Judges of the High Court of Justice in Ireland
Alumni of King's Inns
Irish Unionist Party MPs
Liberal Unionist Party MPs for Irish constituencies